Radio Poland (until January 2007 as Radio Polonia, later "Polish Radio External Service", in Polish legislation also named as Polskie Radio Program V)  is the official international broadcasting station of Poland. 

Radio Poland is a part of Poland’s public radio network - Polish Radio. Its aim is to broadcast programs on developments in Poland, Polish foreign policy, the economy, business and foreign investments. Polish Radio External Service provides objective and impartial information about Poland and its stance on international affairs. It shows Polish society, its daily life as well as scientific and cultural achievements. Polish Radio External Service ended their English language shortwave broadcasts in 2012 and announced that they would be ceasing all shortwave transmissions on 27 October 2013, from which point they will only be broadcasting over the internet and through partnerships such as the World Radio Network.

History
1936 – Polish Radio launches shortwave broadcasts of brief programmes in English and Polish
1945 – after the end of World War 2, the shortwave channel Warszawa III resumes external broadcasts 
1959 - Polish Radio starts broadcasting in Esperanto
1990 – Polish Radio starts broadcasting for Ukraine, Belarus, Lithuania, Latvia and Estonia 
2000 – Radio Polonia begins daily Real Audio broadcasts in several languages via the World Radio Network
2007 - Radio Polonia changed name into Polish Radio External Service
2012 - English language shortwave transmissions end. 
2013 - Remaining shortwave services close on 27 October.
2014 - Polish Radio External Service changed name into Radio Poland

Programmes
Radio Poland broadcast in six languages: Polish, English, German, Russian, Ukrainian and Belarusian (with various amount of programming, for example English is available 24 hours a day while German 90 minutes a day). There is a Hebrew language programming, Kol Polin, which includes a weekly Yiddish-language broadcast called Naye Khvalyes ("New Waves"). 

Shortwave transmissions were reduced between 2007 and 2012 and by 2013 PRES was broadcasting two times a day with programmes in Polish, Belarusian and Russian. On 27 October 2013 all shortwave transmissions ceased and PRES became an online only entity.

Radio Poland brings:
 news bulletins
 news analysis
 press reviews
 correspondent’s dispatches
 interviews and discussions
 features

The English service broadcast programming with more variety; including quizzes, chart shows and historical programming.

Listen
Listeners in Europe can tune in via satellite on Eutelsat 13 E, 10892 MHz, FEC 3/4, SR 27500, Horizontal, PID audio 0119

Polish Radio External Service can be heard in English on the World Radio Network (WRN) through terrestrial relays, on cable and via satellite.

On cable: PR ES in English is also available to 4.5 million homes on cable in London, Dublin, Berlin, Amsterdam, Brussels, Vienna, Strassburg, Geneva, Tokyo, Washington D.C. and many other cities. It can also be heard on hotel cable in the Netherlands and Hong Kong.

Internet
"Radio Poland - English Service"   (English)

48 kbit/s aac+:
http://player.polskieradio.pl/-5
http://stream85.polskieradio.pl/pr5/pr5.sdp/playlist.m3u8
rtmp://stream85.polskieradio.pl/pr5/pr5.sdp
http://player.polskieradio.pl/-15
http://stream85.polskieradio.pl/pr5/pr5_ang.sdp/playlist.m3u8
rtmp://stream85.polskieradio.pl/pr5/pr5_ang.sdp
http://mp3.polskieradio.pl:8958
http://stream3.polskieradio.pl:8958

96 kbit/s mp3:
http://mp3.polskieradio.pl:8908
http://stream3.polskieradio.pl:8908

"Radio Poland DAB+"   (Belarusian, English, Ukrainian, Russian)

48 kbit/s aac+:
http://player.polskieradio.pl/-13
http://stream85.polskieradio.pl/pr5/pr5_dab.sdp/playlist.m3u8
rtmp://stream85.polskieradio.pl/pr5/pr5_dab.sdp

96 kbit/s mp3:
http://mp3.polskieradio.pl:8912
http://stream3.polskieradio.pl:8912

"Radio Poland East" / "Радио Польша"   (Belarusian, Polish, Russian, Ukrainian)

48 kbit/s aac+:
http://player.polskieradio.pl/-16
http://stream85.polskieradio.pl/pr5/pr5_wsch.sdp/playlist.m3u8
rtmp://stream85.polskieradio.pl/pr5/pr5_wsch.sdp
http://mp3.polskieradio.pl:8964
http://stream3.polskieradio.pl:8964

96 kbit/s mp3:
http://mp3.polskieradio.pl:8914
http://stream3.polskieradio.pl:8914

WRN satellite relays
Europe

In English WRN Europe 
Eutelsat 28A 28.5°E SKY digital
In English WRN English Hot Bird 13°E, 12.597 GHz

North America

In English
Telstar 5 97° W, 12.177 GHz, pol. V

Asia, Australia 
In English
AsiaSat 100.5° E, 4.000 GHz, 
European Bouquet package

Africa 
In English
PanAmSat 4 68.5° E, Multichoice package

WRN terrestrial relays

Europe
In Polish:
Medium wave - Radio Baltic Waves 1386 AM (Viešintos, Utena County, Lithuania, 75 kW) (16:30-17:00 UTC)
Lithuania - Vilnius - Radio znad Wilii 103.8 FM (18:30-19:00 and 23:00-23:30 local time)
Ukraine - Lviv - Radio Nezalezhnist 106.7 FM (18:30-19:00 local time)
In Belarusian: 
Poland - DAB+ network - Radio Poland DAB+ (15:30-16:00 Polish time)
Medium wave - Radio Baltic Waves 1386 AM (Viešintos, Utena County, Lithuania, 75 kW) (4:00-5:00 UTC)
Lithuania - Vilnius - Radio znad Wilii 103.8 FM (5:00-6:00, 23:30-0:00 local time)
In Ukrainian:
Poland - DAB+ network - Radio Poland DAB+ (19:00-20:00, 0:30-1:00 and 4:30-5:00 Polish time)
Poland - DAB+ network - Polish Radio for Ukraine (9:00-23:00 Polish time, timeshare with Ukrainian Radio (23:00-9:00 Polish time))
Medium wave - Radio Baltic Waves 1386 AM (Viešintos, Utena County, Lithuania, 75 kW) (5:00-5:30 UTC)
Ukraine - Hromadske radio (Kyiv 99.4 FM, Lviv 93.3 FM, Nikopol 91.5 FM, Hirnyk 91.4 FM, Kramators'k 90.9 FM) (7:00-7:30 local time)
In German:
Poland - DAB+ network - Radio Poland DAB+ (13:30-14:00 and 21:00-21:30 Polish time)
Medium wave - Radio Baltic Waves 1386 AM (Viešintos, Utena County, Lithuania, 75 kW) (17:00-17:30 UTC)
In English:
Poland - DAB+ network - Radio Poland DAB+
Medium wave - Radio Baltic Waves 1386 AM (Viešintos, Utena County, Lithuania, 75 kW) (13:00-14:00 UTC)
In Russian:
Poland - DAB+ network - Radio Poland DAB+
Medium wave - Radio Baltic Waves 1386 AM (Viešintos, Utena County, Lithuania, 75 kW) (16:00-16:30 UTC)

North America
In English:
USA: NY Radio Rampa 620 AM
USA: Rihnelander (Wisconsin) WXPR 97,1 FM
USA: Spokane (Washington) KSFC 91,9 FM
USA: Monroe Uniwersity of Louisiana  KEDM 90,3 FM
In Polish:
USA: Chicago Polskie Radio 1300 AM
Canada: Calgary - Międzynarodowe Radio Fairchild 94,7 FM
Canada: Vancouver - Międzynarodowe Radio Fairchild 1470 AM
Canada: Toronto - Międzynarodowe Radio Fairchild 1430 AM
Canada: Toronto - Radio Polonia 100,7 FM

See also 
 Polskie Radio, the Polish publicly funded radio broadcaster
Eastern Bloc information dissemination

References

External links
 Polish Radio External Service Website 
 Listen to Polish Radio External Service online 

Polskie Radio
International broadcasters
Radio stations established in 1936
1936 establishments in Poland
Polish news websites

eo:Radio Polonia